Events in the year 2017 in the European Union.

Incumbents 
 President of the European Council
 Donald Tusk
 Commission President
 Jean-Claude Juncker 
 Council Presidency 
 (Jan – Jun 2017) 
 (July – Dec 2017) 
 Parliament President
 Martin Schulz (until January 17)
 Antonio Tajani (from January 17)
 High Representative
 Federica Mogherini

Events

January 
1 January
Malta takes over the six-month rotating presidency of the Council of EU.
Aarhus (Denmark) and Pafos (Cyprus) are the European Capitals of Culture for 2017. Both cities will host events to promote their local culture.

September 
 16 September European Union official announced United States will not treaty Paris Climate, after withdrew Paris agreement.

November 
 17 November Social summit for fair jobs and growth in Gothenburg

European Capitals of Culture
 Aarhus, Denmark
 Pafos, Cyprus

See also
History of the European Union
Timeline of European Union history

References

 
Years of the 21st century in the European Union
2010s in the European Union